The men's decathlon event at the 2013 Summer Universiade was held on 8–9 July.

Medalists

Results

100 metres
Wind:Heat 1:  +0.1 m/s, Heat 2: -0.5 m/s

Long jump

Shot put

High jump

400 metres

110 metres hurdles
Wind:Heat 1: +0.3 m/s, Heat 2: -0.3 m/s

Discus throw

Pole vault

Javelin throw

1500 metres

Final standings

References

Decathlon
2013